Bretherton is a village in England.

Bretherton may also refer to:

Places
Places in Bretherton, England
St John the Baptist's Church, Bretherton, parish church in Bretherton
Carr House (Bretherton, Lancashire, England), house in Bretherton
Brethertons, solicitors firm in Rugby

People with the surname
Alex Bretherton (born 1982), English former rugby league footballer
Bartholomew Bretherton (c.1775-1857), English coach proprietor 
Bartholomew Bretherton (jockey) (1812-1866), English jockey
Basil Bretherton (1917-1997), Australian rules footballer
David Bretherton (1924-2000), American film editor
Francis Bretherton (1935-2021), British mathematician
Howard Bretherton (1890-1969), American film director and editor
James Bretherton (1862-1926), English cricketer
Joe Bretherton (born 1995), English rugby league footballer
Liam Bretherton (born 1979), Irish former rugby league footballer
Mary Stapleton-Bretherton (1809-1883), British landowner
Peter Bretherton (1905-1980), Australian rules footballer
Philip Bretherton (born 1955), English actor
Russell Frederick Bretherton (1906-1991), British economist
William "Billy" Bretherton (born 1968), host of Billy the Exterminator

Other uses
Bretherton equation, introduced by Francis Bretherton
Bretherton: Khaki or Field Grey?, a novel by W.F. Morris